William Burt (23 August 1778 – 1 September 1826) was an English miscellaneous writer, son of Joseph Burt of Plymouth. He was educated at Exeter grammar school, and afterwards articled to a banker and solicitor at Bridgwater. Finally he practised at Plymouth as a solicitor until his death on 1 September 1826. He edited the Plymouth and Dock Telegraph for several years.

Works 

 Twelve Rambles in London, by Amicus Patriæ (1810)
 Desultory Reflections on Banks in general, and the System of keeping up a False Capital by Accommodation (1810)
 The Consequences of the French Revolution to England considered, with a view of the Remedies of which her situation is susceptible (1811)
 A Review of the Mercantile, Trading, and Manufacturing State, Interests, and Capabilities of the Port of Plymouth (1816)
 Preface to and Notes on N. T. Carrington's Poem “Dartmoor (1826)
 Christianity; a Poem, in Three Books, with Miscellaneous Notes (1835)
 Observations on the Curiosities of Nature (1836)

References

English solicitors
Writers from Plymouth, Devon
1778 births
1826 deaths
19th-century English non-fiction writers
English male non-fiction writers
19th-century English male writers